Gora is a rural locality (a village) in Tiginskoye Rural Settlement, Vozhegodsky District, Vologda Oblast, Russia. The population was 9 as of 2002.

Geography 
The distance to Vozhega is 52 km, to Gridino is 26 km. Baranikha, Mushchininskaya, Lobanikha, Pozdeyevskaya, Zabereznik, Korotkovskaya, Zavrag, Koryakinskaya, Grishkovskaya, Shibayevskaya are the nearest rural localities.

References 

Rural localities in Vozhegodsky District